Jake Andrews may refer to:
Jake Andrews (guitarist) (born 1980), American blues guitarist
Jake Andrews (footballer) (born 1997), English footballer
Jake Andrews, Australian musician in 78 Saab
Jake Andrews, presenter on WYBL
Jake Andrews, fictional character in Special Agent